The 1925 All-Ireland Senior Hurling Championship Final was the 38th All-Ireland Final and the culmination of the 1925 All-Ireland Senior Hurling Championship, an inter-county hurling tournament for the top teams in Ireland. The match was held at Croke Park, Dublin, on 6 September 1925, between Galway and Tipperary. The Connacht men lost to the Munster champions on a score line of 5-6 to 1-5.

Match details

1
All-Ireland Senior Hurling Championship Finals
Galway GAA matches
Tipperary GAA matches
All-Ireland Senior Hurling Championship
All-Ireland Senior Hurling Championship Final, 1925